Chetone variifasciata is a moth of the family Erebidae. It was described by Hering in 1930. It is found in Colombia.

References

Chetone
Moths described in 1930